Caloundra is an urban centre in the southern Sunshine Coast region of Queensland, Australia.

Caloundra may also refer to:
 City of Caloundra, former local government area until 2008 in Caloundra, Queensland
 Caloundra (suburb), central business district in Caloundra, Queensland
 Electoral district of Caloundra, an electoral district of the Legislative Assembly of Queensland